Dinko Paleka is a Croatian director, producer, writer and actor. Born in 1979. in Croatia. As of 2012, he is the managing director of FreemantleMedia Croatia. Producer of Super Talent. His net worth was estimated to be £1.2 million in 2014.

Filmography

Producer
Ruža vjetrova (2011)
Zabranjena ljubav (2007–08)

Director
Zabranjena ljubav (2006–07)

Actor
Zabranjena ljubav as Zvonko Basic (2006)

Writer
Ruža vjetrova (2011–present)

References

Year of birth missing (living people)
Croatian male television actors
Living people